Anochetus is a genus of small, carnivorous ants found in the tropics and subtropics throughout the world.

This genus is present in both the Old and New World and is certainly native to all continents except Antarctica and Europe. In Europe only a single species, Anochetus ghilianii, has been found, and it is not certain it is native to its European range (Province of Cadiz and Gibraltar). However A. ghilianii is native to Morocco.

Anochetus is of some note due to it being one of the relatively few genera that possess trap-jaws, or specialized long mandibles that have a rapid closing mechanism. However, it is the only other genus, other than Odontomachus that uses the mandibles for predator evasion as well as prey capture.

Species

Anochetus africanus (Mayr, 1865)
Anochetus agilis Emery, 1901
Anochetus alae Shattuck & Slipinska, 2012
Anochetus altisquamis Mayr, 1887
†Anochetus ambiguus De Andrade, 1994
Anochetus angolensis Brown, 1978
Anochetus armstrongi McAreavey, 1949
Anochetus avius Shattuck & Slipinska, 2012
Anochetus bequaerti Forel, 1913
Anochetus bispinosus (Smith, 1858)
Anochetus boltoni Fisher & Smith, 2008
†Anochetus brevidentatus MacKay, 1991
Anochetus brevis Brown, 1978
Anochetus bytinskii Kugler & Ionescu, 2007
Anochetus cato Forel, 1901
Anochetus chirichinii Emery, 1897
Anochetus chocoensis Fernández, 2008
†Anochetus conisquamis De Andrade, 1994
Anochetus consultans (Walker, 1859)
†Anochetus corayi Baroni Urbani, 1980
Anochetus cryptus Bharti & Wachkoo, 2013
Anochetus daedalus
Anochetus diegensis Forel, 1912
†Anochetus dubius De Andrade, 1994
Anochetus elegans Lattke, 1987
Anochetus emarginatus (Fabricius, 1804)
Anochetus evansi Crawley, 1922
†Anochetus exstinctus De Andrade, 1994
Anochetus faurei Arnold, 1948
Anochetus filicornis (Wheeler, 1929)
Anochetus fricatus Wilson, 1959
Anochetus fuliginosus Arnold, 1948
Anochetus ghilianii (Spinola, 1851)
Anochetus gladiator (Mayr, 1862)
Anochetus goodmani Fisher & Smith, 2008
Anochetus graeffei Mayr, 1870
Anochetus grandidieri Forel, 1891
Anochetus haytianus Wheeler & Mann, 1914
Anochetus hohenbergiae Feitosa & Delabie, 2012
Anochetus horridus Kempf, 1964
Anochetus inca Wheeler, 1925
Anochetus incultus Brown, 1978
Anochetus ineditus Baroni Urbani, 1971
Anochetus inermis André, 1889
†Anochetus intermedius De Andrade, 1994
Anochetus isolatus Mann, 1919
Anochetus jonesi Arnold, 1926
Anochetus kanariensis Forel, 1900
Anochetus katonae Forel, 1907
Anochetus kempfi Brown, 1978
Anochetus levaillanti Emery, 1895
Anochetus leyticus Zettel, 2012
Anochetus longifossatus Mayr, 1897
Anochetus longispinus Wheeler, 1936
†Anochetus lucidus De Andrade, 1994
Anochetus madagascarensis Forel, 1887
Anochetus madaraszi Mayr, 1897
Anochetus maryatiae Nuril Aida & Idris, 2011
Anochetus maynei Forel, 1913
Anochetus mayri Emery, 1884
Anochetus menozzii Donisthorpe, 1941
Anochetus micans Brown, 1978
Anochetus minans Mann, 1922
Anochetus miserabilis González-Campero & Elizalde, 2008
Anochetus mixtus Radchenko, 1993
Anochetus modicus Brown, 1978
Anochetus muzziolii Menozzi, 1932
Anochetus myops Emery, 1893
Anochetus natalensis Arnold, 1926
Anochetus neglectus Emery, 1894
Anochetus nietneri (Roger, 1861)
Anochetus obscuratus Santschi, 1911
Anochetus obscurior Brown, 1978
Anochetus orchidicola Brown, 1978
Anochetus oriens Kempf, 1964
Anochetus orientalis André, 1887
Anochetus pangantihoni Zettel, 2012
Anochetus pangens (Walker, 1859)
Anochetus paripungens Brown, 1978
Anochetus pattersoni Fisher & Smith, 2008
Anochetus pellucidus [no authors], 1902
Anochetus peracer Brown, 1978
Anochetus princeps Emery, 1884
Anochetus pubescens Brown, 1978
Anochetus punctaticeps Mayr, 1901
Anochetus pupulatus Brown, 1978
Anochetus rectangularis Mayr, 1876
Anochetus renatae Shattuck & Slipinska, 2012
Anochetus risii Forel, 1900
Anochetus rossi Donisthorpe, 1949
Anochetus rothschildi Forel, 1907
Anochetus rufolatus Shattuck & Slipinska, 2012
Anochetus rufostenus Shattuck & Slipinska, 2012
Anochetus rufus (Jerdon, 1851)
Anochetus ruginotus Stitz, 1925
Anochetus rugosus (Smith, 1857)
Anochetus schoedli Zettel, 2012
Anochetus sedilloti Emery, 1884
Anochetus seminiger Donisthorpe, 1943
Anochetus shohki Terayama, 1996
Anochetus simoni Emery, 1890
Anochetus siphneus Brown, 1978
Anochetus splendidulus Yasumatsu, 1940
Anochetus striatulus Emery, 1890
Anochetus strigatellus Brown, 1978
Anochetus subcoecus Forel, 1912
Anochetus taiwaniensis Terayama, 1989
Anochetus talpa Forel, 1901
Anochetus targionii Emery, 1894
Anochetus testaceus Forel, 1893
Anochetus traegaordhi Mayr, 1904
Anochetus tua Brown, 1978
Anochetus turneri Forel, 1900
Anochetus validus Bharti & Wachkoo, 2013
Anochetus vallensis Lattke, 1987
Anochetus variegatus Donisthorpe, 1938
Anochetus veronicae Shattuck & Slipinska, 2012
Anochetus vexator Kempf, 1964
Anochetus victoriae Shattuck & Slipinska, 2012
Anochetus werneri Zettel, 2012
Anochetus wiesiae Shattuck & Slipinska, 2012
Anochetus yerburyi Forel, 1900
Anochetus yunnanensis Wang, 1993

References

External links
 
 

Ponerinae
Ant genera
Extant Burdigalian first appearances
Taxa named by Gustav Mayr